Anglesey County may refer to:

 Anglesey County, Victoria, Australia
 Anglesey County, Wales, UK